Emigrant Pass is a mountain pass in Eureka County, Nevada, United States. Interstate 80 now follows the California Trail's route over the pass.

References

Landforms of Eureka County, Nevada
Mountain passes of Nevada
Interstate 80